Adolf Grabowsky (August 31, 1880 in Berlin – August 23, 1969 in Arlesheim, Switzerland) was a German political scientist and author of several books about geopolitics and political theory, including "Democracy and Dictatorship" (1949).  He was a Jewish convert to Protestantism, and founder and editor of the Zeitschrift für Politik.  He was a supporter of the Weimar democracy.

References

External links
 

1880 births
1969 deaths
Writers from Berlin
People from the Province of Brandenburg
Free Conservative Party politicians
German political scientists
Geopoliticians
Academic staff of the University of Giessen
German military personnel of World War I
German emigrants to Switzerland
Commanders Crosses of the Order of Merit of the Federal Republic of Germany
20th-century political scientists